Tu cara me suena may refer to:

 Tu cara me suena (Spanish TV series), a Spanish reality competition television series where celebrity contestants impersonate singers
 Tu cara me suena (Argentinian TV series), an Argentinian reality competition television series based on the Spanish series
 Tu cara me suena (American TV series), an American Spanish-language reality competition television series based on the Spanish series